Streptomyces finlayi is a bacterium species from the genus of Streptomyces which has been isolated from soil from the plant Trifolium alexandrinum in Russia.

See also 
 List of Streptomyces species

References

Further reading

External links
Type strain of Streptomyces finlayi at BacDive -  the Bacterial Diversity Metadatabase

finlayi
Bacteria described in 1970